This is a list of ice companies. Ice companies manufacture and market ice and are involved in the ice trade. Some ice companies manufacture and market dry ice.

Ice companies

 American Ice Company – a business that manufactured and delivered ice throughout the mid-Atlantic U.S. states. Its site is a historic ice manufacturing plant located in Baltimore, Maryland, United States that is listed on the U.S. National Register of Historic Places (NRHP). It is a large industrial brick building constructed in 1911 for the American Ice Company.
 American Ice Company Baltimore Plant No. 2 – a historic American Ice Company ice manufacturing plant located in Baltimore, Maryland
 Barbados Ice Company Limited
 Belton Ice Company, Belton, Missouri
 Berkshire Ice company 
 Boston Ice Company 
 Cash Ice LLC
 Cedar Falls Ice and Fuel Company
 Ceylon Cold Stores
 Crystal Ice Company – a former company that sold ice to travelers. The Crystal Ice Company Building is listed on the U.S. NRHP.
 Crystal Lake Ice Company, Barton, Vermont
 Crystal Lake Ice Company, Crystal Lake, Illinois
 Crystal Lake Ice Company, Lowell, Massachusetts
 Crystal Lake Ice Company, Newton, Massachusetts
 Crystal Lake Ice Company, Minneapolis, Minnesota
 Danbury Ice Company 
 Dry Ice International 
 Florida Ice and Farm Company
 Follett Ice – a privately held company that manufactures beverage and ice for the healthcare, foodservice, hospitality, and supermarket industries. Headquartered in Easton, Pennsylvania, the company operates two manufacturing facilities in Easton and Gdansk, Poland.
 Fresh Pond Ice Company - a former Massachusetts ice harvesting company, incorporated in 1887 by Jacob Hittinger. The company harvested natural ice from Fresh Pond until the acquisition of the pond by the City of Cambridge, then opened ice harvesting operations from Lake Potanipo in Brookline, New Hampshire.

 Grand Forks Ice Company
 Grimsby Ice Factory – a former ice factory located in Grimsby, England that was built in 1900 to provide crushed ice for ships to keep stored fish cold. It engaged in operations up to 1990. The site is  managed by the Great Grimsby Ice Factory Trust. The buildings still contain some of the original historic machinery from times of the operations' origins. It is a Grade 2 listed building that is  owned by Associated British Ports.
 Idaho Ice and Cold Storage Company – former ice company in Lewiston, Idaho
 Ice Lab
 Kalgoorlie Brewing and Ice Company
 Knickerbocker Ice Company – was an ice company based in New York State during the 19th century
 Milford Ice and Refrigeration Company
 Morewood Lake Ice company
 Mutual Ice Company – its building in Westport, Kansas City, Missouri is listed on the U.S. NRHP
 New Britain Ice Corporation 
 New State Ice Company
 People's Ice Company 
 Princeton Ice Company
 Rosedale Ice Company
 R. and W. Scott Ice Company Powerhouse and Ice House Site
 Standard Ice Company – its building in downtown Stuttgart, Arkansas is listed on the U.S. NRHP
 Wenham Lake Ice Company – operating out of Wenham Lake in Wenham, Massachusetts, United States, harvested ice and exported it all around the world before the advent of factory-made ice
 West Haven Ice Company 
 The York Ice Company

See also

 Ice house (building)
 Icemaker
 Iceman (occupation)
 Lists of companies – company-related list articles on Wikipedia

References

Ice companies
Ice